Guangzhou North Railway Station is a metro station of Line 9 of the Guangzhou Metro. The metro station opened on 28 December 2017. It will be served by Line 24 in the future.

The metro station is located at the west side of the Huadu railway station and Guangzhou North railway station.

Station layout

Exits

References

Guangzhou Metro stations in Huadu District
Railway stations in China opened in 2017